The Queen of Sheba is a 1952 Italian adventure film directed by Pietro Francisci.

Plot
King Solomon (Gino Cervi) sends his son, Prince Rehoboam (Gino Leurini) on a spy mission to Sheba where he falls in love with the beautiful Queen (Leonora Ruffo).  He tries to prevent a war between their two countries, but after the Queen finds out that her lover is a spy, she leads her army in an assault against Jerusalem.  The siege is a failure and ends with the Queen and Prince reuniting with the blessing of both King Solomon and Sheba's advisors.

Cast

Leonora Ruffo as Balkis, Queen of Sheba
Gino Cervi as King Solomon of Jerusalem
Marina Berti as Zamira, Betrothed of Rehoboam
Gino Leurini as Prince Rehoboam of Jerusalem
Franco Silva as Kabaal, Commander of Sheban Army
Mario Ferrari as Chaldis, High Priest of Sheba
Dorian Gray as  Ati
Umberto Silvestri as Isachar, Companion of Rehoboam
Isa Pola as Tabui
Nyta Dover as Kinnor
Franca Tamantini as False mother
Fulvia Mammi as True mother
Achille Majeroni as Blind merchant
Aldo Fiorelli as Abner
Pietro Tordi as Onabar 
Mimmo Palmara 
Ugo Sasso  
Afro Poli 
Cesare Fantoni

References

External links 

 

1952 films
1950s adventure drama films
Films scored by Nino Rota
Films directed by Pietro Francisci
Films about Solomon
Films set in the 10th century BC
Films set in Jerusalem
Religious epic films
Peplum films
Sword and sandal films
1952 drama films
Italian adventure drama films
Italian black-and-white films
Films set in ancient Israel
1950s Italian films